Sigi Lemmerer is an Austrian Hackbrett (hammered dulcimer) player and musical composition arranger.  He also plays Steirische Harmonika, piano, guitar, percussion, and contrabass.

Background 

Originally from Wörschach, Austria, Sigi Lemmerer has lived in Baton Rouge, Louisiana, and given concert tours through Europe, the US, and Asia.  He is a member of numerous ensembles, including musical director of the folk music Trio Lemmerer and co-founder of the bands Yaga T and IRISHsteirisch. He has had television appearances on the Austrian and German stations ORF, ZDF, and Sat.1. 
In 2016, Lemmerer received the cult of the state of Styria

Discography
 2012 – Primetime, classic alpin (Vienna Volksoper Chamber Ensemble and Trio Lemmerer), composer, arranger, hammered dulcimer (primetime label)
 2007 – duat wia do, IRISHsteirisch, co-producer, composer, arranger, hammered dulcimer, accordion, feadoga isle, Spanish guitar, vocals
 2003 – Oafoch Leb'n, IRISHsteirisch, composer (Koch Records) 
 1995 – San ma gscheit, bleib ma bled, Yaga T, composer, vocals, hammered dulcimer, keyboards (Sony Music Entertainment Austria GesmbH)
 1989 – Mit Hackbrett und Harmonika, Lemmerer Trio, composer, arranger, hammered dulcimer (Bogner Records)

Notes

External links 
 IRISHsteirisch web site
 Playlist of YouTube videos

Hammered dulcimer players
Austrian male musicians
Living people
Year of birth missing (living people)